Mian Muhammad Munir is a Pakistani politician who was a Member of the Provincial Assembly of the Punjab, from May 2013 to May 2018.

Early life and education
He was born on 13 December 1954 in Okara in Arain Family.

He graduated in 2002 from Bahauddin Zakariya University and has the degree of Bachelor of Arts.

Political career

He was elected to the Provincial Assembly of the Punjab as a candidate of Pakistan Muslim League (Nawaz) from Constituency PP-190 (Okara-VI) in 2013 Pakistani general election.

In December 2013, he was appointed as Parliamentary Secretary for Excise & Taxation.

References

Living people
Punjab MPAs 2013–2018
1954 births
Pakistan Muslim League (N) politicians